Lajos Alois Hess (1903–1956) was an Austrian-born Israeli footballer who played for Hakoah Vienna and Maccabi Tel Aviv.

Career
Hess started playing for Hakoah Vienna in 1919 was part of the squad that beat West Ham United F.C. in London, scoring the third goal of the match, as well as being part of the team that toured North America in 1927 and 1929.

Hess emigrated to Mandatory Palestine in 1934, joining Maccabi Tel Aviv, as well as serving as the team's manager. In 1937 Hess was appointed as manager of the newly formed Beitar Tel Aviv, a position he held until 1947.

In 1949, Hess was appointed as manager of the Israel national football team ahead of the national team's 1950 FIFA World Cup qualification campaign. In his first match as manager of the national team, against Cyprus, Israel recorded its first victory as independent country (having previously beaten Lebanon as Mandatory Palestine in 1940), beating its rivals 3–1. The national team was beaten in both qualification matches by Yugoslavia, and Hess left the position.

Hess returned to Beitar Tel Aviv in 1954, as the team was at risk of relegation to Liga Bet He died in Tel Aviv on 3 July 1956 during a practice.

References

1903 births
1956 deaths
Austro-Hungarian Jews
Austrian footballers
SC Hakoah Wien footballers
Beitar Tel Aviv F.C. players
Beitar Tel Aviv F.C. managers
Maccabi Tel Aviv F.C. players
Maccabi Tel Aviv F.C. managers
Austrian football managers
Israel national football team managers
Austrian emigrants to Mandatory Palestine
Jewish Austrian sportspeople
Association footballers not categorized by position